Leuna Chemie Stadion, known as Erdgas Sportpark until 2021, is a stadium in Halle, Germany. It has a capacity of 15,057 spectators.  It is the home of Hallescher FC and replaced Kurt-Wabbel-Stadion.

References

Football venues in Germany
Sports venues completed in 2011
Hallescher FC
Sports venues in Saxony-Anhalt
Buildings and structures in Halle (Saale)
Sport in Halle (Saale)